Gary Michael Porter (born 6 March 1966 in Sunderland) is a former footballer who played either as a left-back or a midfielder. He spent 13 years at Watford, and also played in the Football League for Walsall and Scarborough. He was capped 12 times for England at under-21 level.

Porter spent the majority of his professional career at Watford, turning professional in 1984. He made 472 appearances for the club in all competitions – the third highest by any player for the club, behind Luther Blissett and Nigel Gibbs – scoring 51 goals, as well as being voted Player of the Season in 1993–94. He was released in 1996 following a lengthy injury.

Porter moved to Walsall and later had spells at Scarborough and Boston United. He now works as a football agent.

References

1966 births
Living people
Footballers from Sunderland
English footballers
England under-21 international footballers
Association football midfielders
Watford F.C. players
Walsall F.C. players
Scarborough F.C. players
Boston United F.C. players